is a private university in Hachioji, Tokyo, Japan, founded in 1966 by Japanese art educator, fashion designer and design journalist, Yoko Kuwasawa (1910-1977). It is a four-year art college offering both bachelor's and master's degrees in studio arts. In 2016 a Doctoral (Ph.D.) program was established in Design Education and Research. The campus is situated in woodland within walking distance of Aihara Station on the JR Yokohama Line, but a university bus runs between station and campus.

Departments and majors

The university consists of two schools, Design and Fine Arts. The School of Fine Arts offers bachelor's degree in two majors, Painting and Sculpture, while the School of Design offers bachelor's degree in Graphic Design, Photography, Film, Animation, Media Design, Interior Design, Industrial Design, Textile Design and Sustainable Project majors.

Master's degree is also offered in two research areas, Design and Fine Arts.

International exchange 

Tokyo Zokei University has been promoting more active education and research through international exchange programs with prestigious academic institutions abroad. 
Current partner universities/colleges are as follows:
 Accademia di Bella Arti di Carrara
 Konstfack University College of Arts Crafts and Design
 School of Photography, Goteborg University
 The Academy of Fine Arts in Vienna
 Royal Academy of Fine Arts, The Hague/KABK
 Willem de Kooning Academy of Hogeschool Rotterdam
 UWE Bristol, School of Art, Media and Design
 Winchester School of Art, University of Southampton
 Hochschule für Gestaltung, Schwäbisch Gmünd

Faculty

Yasuhiro Ishimoto, photographer
Katsuhito Nakazato, photographer
Nobuhiro Suwa, film director
Yutaka Takanashi, photographer

Alumni

Kunio Ōkawara, anime designer
Nobuhiro Suwa, film director
Kōji Yamamura, animation director
Hiroyuki Ito, video game director
Toshihiro Nagoshi, video game producer and designer, chief creative officer of Sega
Obetomo (born Tomoko Okabe), illustrator and animator
Keiichiro Toyama, video game director

DESIS Network
TZU DESIS Lab

Notes

External links
 
 https://www.zokei.ac.jp/en/ 

Educational institutions established in 1966
Private universities and colleges in Japan
Tokyo Zokei University
Western Tokyo
1966 establishments in Japan
Hachiōji, Tokyo
Art schools in Japan